Vitisin may refer to several substances extracted from grapevines:
 Vitisin A
 Vitisin B
 Vitisin C, a stilbenoid